Engutoto is an administrative ward in the Arusha District of the Arusha Region of Tanzania. Meaning the hidden place in Maasai.  According to the 2012 census, the ward has a total population of 7,426.

References

Wards of Arusha City
Wards of Arusha Region